The Rural Municipality of Francis No. 127 is a rural municipality (RM) in the Canadian province of Saskatchewan within Census Division No. 6 and  Division No. 1. It is located in the southeast portion of the province.

History 
The RM of Francis No. 127 incorporated as a rural municipality on December 13, 1909.

Geography

Communities and localities 
The following urban municipalities are surrounded by the RM.

Towns
Francis

Villages
Odessa
Sedley
Vibank

Demographics 

Government 
The RM of Francis No. 127 is governed by an elected municipal council and an appointed administrator that meets on the second Thursday of every month. The reeve of the RM is Morley Richard while its administrator is Shala Kanasevich. The RM's office is located in Francis.

References

External links 

F

Division No. 6, Saskatchewan